Rihards is a masculine Latvian given name and may refer to:

Rihards Bukarts (born 1995), Latvian ice hockey player
Rihards Dubra (born 1964), Latvian composer
Rihards Kotāns (1956–2010), Latvian bobsledder
Rihards Kozlovskis (born 1969), Latvian politician and lawyer
Rihards Kuksiks (born 1988), Latvian basketball player
Rihards Lomažs (born 1996), Latvian basketball player
Rihards Marenis (born 1993), Latvian ice hockey player
Rihards Pīks (born 1941), Latvian politician
Rihards Veide (born 1991), Latvian BMX racer
Rihards Zariņš (1869–1939), Latvian graphic artist

Latvian masculine given names